Elections for the City of Glasgow District Council took place on Thursday 5 May 1988, alongside elections to the councils of Scotland's various other districts.

Labour continued its control of the council whilst the Conservatives vote share continued to drop. Voter turnout was 42%, up from 40.3% in the previous election.

Aggregate results

Ward results

References

1988
1988 Scottish local elections